Roger Graham may refer to:

Real people
 Roger A. Graham (1885–1938), music publisher, lyricist, and composer
 Roger Graham (American football) (born 1972), American football player
 Roger Phillips Graham or Rog Phillips (1909–1965), American science fiction writer
 W. Roger Graham (1919–1988), Canadian historian

Fictional characters 
 Roger Graham, character in the 1945 mystery film Strange Confession
 Roger Graham, character in the 1992 film Unlawful Entry

See also